The 1998 Jacksonville Jaguars season was the franchise’s fourth year in the National Football League. The team equaled the 11–5 record from their previous season, but won their first division title, as both the Oilers and the Pittsburgh Steelers lost crucial games near the end of the regular season. The Jaguars appeared twice on Monday Night Football.

NFL draft

Personnel

Staff

Roster

Regular season

Schedule

Note: Intra-division opponents are in bold text.

Season summary

Week 1 at Chicago Bears

Standings

Postseason

Schedule

Game summaries

AFC Wild Card Playoffs: vs (6) New England Patriots

Fred Taylor runs for 162 yards and a touchdown on 31 carries. The Patriots had just 206 total yards and the Jaguars defense forced three turnovers.

AFC Divisional Playoffs: vs (2) New York Jets

Mark Brunell throws for three touchdowns, but completes just 12 of 31 passes with three interceptions. The Jaguars committed four turnovers.

Awards and records
 Mark Brunell, Franchise Record (tied), Most Touchdown Passes in One Game, 4 Passes (November 29, 1998) 
 Mark Brunell, Franchise Record, Most Touchdown Passes in One Season, 20 Passes (November 29, 1998) 
 Fred Taylor, Franchise Record, Most Touchdowns in One Season, 17 
 Single Game Home Attendance Record, 74,143, December 28, 1998 
 Single Season Home Attendance Record, 561,472, December 28, 1998

References

 Jaguars on Pro Football Reference
 Jaguars Schedule on jt-sw.com

Jacksonville Jaguars
Jacksonville Jaguars seasons
AFC Central championship seasons
Jackson